Below is a list of FC Bayern Munich players who have played 40 or more games in the Bundesliga for Bayern Munich. For all Bayern Munich players with an article, see :Category:FC Bayern Munich footballers, and for the current squad see the main club article. Appearances are up to date as of 11 August 2022. Active players are in bold.

List of players

World Cup winners

The following players won the FIFA World Cup while playing at Bayern Munich
  Hans Bauer (Switzerland 1954)
  Sepp Maier (West Germany 1974)
  Paul Breitner (West Germany 1974)
  Hans-Georg Schwarzenbeck (West Germany 1974)
  Franz Beckenbauer (West Germany 1974)
  Gerd Müller (West Germany 1974)
  Uli Hoeneß (West Germany 1974)
  Jupp Kapellmann (West Germany 1974)
  Stefan Reuter (Italy 1990)
  Jürgen Kohler (Italy 1990)
  Klaus Augenthaler (Italy 1990)
  Raimond Aumann (Italy 1990)
  Hans Pflügler (Italy 1990)
  Olaf Thon (Italy 1990)
  Jorginho (United States 1994)
  Bixente Lizarazu (France 1998)
  Manuel Neuer (Brazil 2014)
  Bastian Schweinsteiger (Brazil 2014)
  Thomas Müller (Brazil 2014)
  Philipp Lahm (Brazil 2014)
  Toni Kroos (Brazil 2014)
  Mario Götze (Brazil 2014)
  Jérôme Boateng (Brazil 2014)
  Corentin Tolisso (Russia 2018)

References

Players
 
Bayern Munich
Association football player non-biographical articles